The Commodore MAX Machine, also known as Ultimax in the United States and Canada and VC-10 in Germany, is a home computer designed and sold by Commodore International in Japan, beginning in early 1982, a predecessor to the popular Commodore 64. The Commodore 64 manual mentions the machine by name, suggesting that Commodore intended to sell the machine internationally; however, it is unclear whether the machine was ever actually sold outside Japan. When it was officially presented, in Tokyo, for the first time, it was named Commodore VICKEY. It is considered a rarity.

The unit had a membrane keyboard and 2 KB of RAM internally and 0.5 KB of color RAM (1024 × 4 bits). It used a television set for a display. It used the same chipset and 6510 CPU as the Commodore 64, the same SID sound chip, and a MOS Technology 6566 graphics chip, a version of the VIC-II that powers the C-64 graphics for the MAX' static RAM. A tape drive could be connected for storage, but it lacked the serial and user ports necessary to connect a disk drive, printer, or modem.

Software was loaded from plug-in cartridges - turning on the MAX with no cartridge inserted yielded only a blank screen. Its ROM cartridge architecture was compatible with that of the C-64, so that MAX cartridges will work in the C-64. The MAX compatibility mode in C-64 was later frequently used for "freezer" cartridges (such as the Action Replay), as a convenient way to take control of the currently running program. 

It was intended to sell for around US$200. Although the MAX had better graphics and sound capability, Commodore's own VIC-20, which sold for around the same amount, was much more expandable, had a much larger software library, and had a better keyboard—all of which made it more attractive to consumers. The MAX never sold well and was quickly discontinued.

See also
 Commodore 64 Games System

References

External links

The UltiMax machine (a.k.a. VIC-10)
The MAX Machine, the odd one out

6502-based home computers
Commodore 64
Products introduced in 1982